Vincent Créhin (born 21 January 1989) is a French professional footballer who plays as a striker for Championnat National 2 club US Granville.

Club career
In the 2010–11 season, Créhin made 15 appearances in Ligue 2 for Laval.

Créhin signed for Nea Salamis Famagusta in the summer of 2020, having quit Le Mans after five seasons at the club.

On 4 June 2021, Créhin returned to France and signed with Championnat National club Cholet.

On 20 June 2022, he signed with Granville in Championnat National 2.

Career statistics

References

External links
 Vincent Créhin at foot-national.com
 
 

1989 births
Footballers from Brittany
Living people
Sportspeople from Quimper
French footballers
Association football forwards
AS Cannes players
Stade Plabennécois players
Stade Lavallois players
AS Beauvais Oise players
USJA Carquefou players
US Avranches players
Amiens SC players
Le Mans FC players
Nea Salamis Famagusta FC players
SO Cholet players
US Granville players
Ligue 2 players
Championnat National players
Championnat National 2 players
Championnat National 3 players
Cypriot First Division players
French expatriate footballers
Expatriate footballers in Cyprus
French expatriate sportspeople in Cyprus